William Hunt was Governor of the Bank of England from 1749 to 1752. He had been Deputy Governor from 1747 to 1749. He replaced Benjamin Longuet as Governor and was succeeded by Alexander Sheafe.

See also
Chief Cashier of the Bank of England

References

External links

Governors of the Bank of England
Year of birth missing
Year of death missing
British bankers
Deputy Governors of the Bank of England